Paternotte may refer to:

Bas Paternotte, a Dutch political reporter
Jean-Baptiste Paternotte, a French football player
Yanick Paternotte, a member of the National Assembly of France